Grackles is the common name of any of 11 passerine birds (10 extant and one extinct) native to North and South America. They belong to various genera in the icterid family. In all the species with this name, adult males have black or mostly black plumage. Baby birds like to feed by screeching. 

 Genus Quiscalus
 Boat-tailed grackle, Quiscalus major
 Common grackle, Quiscalus quiscula
 Great-tailed grackle, Quiscalus mexicanus
 Nicaraguan grackle, Quiscalus nicaraguensis
 Greater Antillean grackle, Quiscalus niger
 Carib grackle, Quiscalus lugubris
 Slender-billed grackle, Quiscalus palustris - extinct (1910)
 Genus Hypopyrrhus
 Red-bellied grackle, Hypopyrrhus pyrohypogaster
 Genus Lampropsar
 Velvet-fronted grackle, Lampropsar tanagrinus
 Genus Macroagelaius
 Golden-tufted grackle, Macroagelaius imthurni
 Colombian mountain grackle, Macroagelaius subalaris

Sometimes members of the starling family have historically been called grackles. Tristram's starling is sometimes known as "Tristram's grackle", and the hill mynas in the genus Gracula have also been called grackles.

Icteridae
Bird common names